Noah's Ark is a 1999 American-Australian television miniseries directed by John Irvin and starring Jon Voight, Mary Steenburgen, F. Murray Abraham, Carol Kane, Jonathan Cake, Alexis Denisof, Emily Mortimer, Sydney Tamiia Poitier, and James Coburn. The film tells the Biblical story of Noah's Ark from the Book of Genesis. It was initially televised in the United States, that same year, was also televised in Canada, Germany and Portugal, among other countries.

Plot
The film portrays Noah as a resident of Sodom and Gomorrah. The two towns are fighting each other simply for the amusement of their residents. During the fight, Lot, Noah's friend, is injured in the fight, and comes to Noah for help. At the end of the fight, the leader of Gomorrah is killed with his head chopped off and put on a stake, as Sodom claims victory. The next day, Noah's sons excitedly ask their father if he took part in the deadly fight. God then asks Noah to go to Mount Tubac, where God reveals that the wickedness of Sodom and Gomorrah has provoked God to destroy the cities.

After Noah fails to find ten righteous people other than Lot and his wife, Noah and his family flee the city with Lot and his wife, who looks back at Sodom as it is being destroyed by fire and brimstone and turns into a pillar of salt.

The next day, they encounter a peddler selling household goods including pots, pans, hats, etc., which is believed to be God in disguise.

Ten years later, Noah and his family are skilled farmers, and his sons are now adults. Lot is also now a villain, as he kills another man for his shoes, and reveals that he used to have faith in God after He sent down the fire and brimstone to Sodom and Gomorrah, but his faith didn't bring him any money, and so he turned to the false gods of the other pagan cultures. One of the sons finds Ruth's Mother crying because her daughter Ruth has been kidnapped by three priests of Mole, the rain god, and will be offered as a sacrifice to Mole in the temple of the god. When Noah is notified by his sons, he warns the people in the temple, who are cheerfully waiting for Ruth to be sacrificed, that they will suffer a worse punishment than the people of Sodom did, and God rips the roof of the temple off and sends thunder and snakes into the building, while striking the three priests with dumbness, blindness and deafness.

God later reveals his plan to flood the world as well, and tells Noah to build an ark. The animals going to the ark pass through the village, which makes the villagers angry. The day the world floods, the angry villagers gather in front of the ark and mock him. When the rain starts, the villagers start to celebrate as it had not rained in years, but Noah and his family quickly board the ark with all the animals and he decided send the boys to bring three girls onboard: Miriam, Esther and Ruth. As the world starts to flood with all of their citizens drowning, Ruth is instructed to come without her mother though she resists doing so at first, and all of Noah's family is thus safe.

Many days have now passed since the flood, the same peddler they encountered the day after Sodom was destroyed by God appears in his now water-converted transportation to give them more supplies.

The village leader and Lot are still alive and they have formed boats of their own. Lot has now become commander after killing the village leader in a fight. He orders the people on the boat to take over the ark, using ropes to try to climb over, but are beaten by Noah and his family with the help of the animals of the ark. God then sends a tidal wave going toward the boat, killing everyone on board as Lot gives off an evil laugh.

After many months impatiently waiting on the ark, Noah and his family are finally free from it as it lands on a mountain, and a new life on Earth begins.

Cast
 Jon Voight – Noah and the uncredited voice of God
 Mary Steenburgen – Naamah
 F. Murray Abraham – Lot
 Carol Kane – Sarah
 Mark Bazeley – Shem
 Jonathan Cake – Japheth
 Alexis Denisof – Ham
 Emily Mortimer – Esther
 Sydney Tamiia Poitier – Ruth
 Sonya Walger – Miriam
 James Coburn – The Peddler
 Max Phipps – Jezer
 Terry Norris – High Priest
 Jonathan Biggins – First Priest
 Sara Farrugia – Villager

Reception
Noah's Ark was critically panned for its creative liberties, rambling plot and irreverent portrayal of Biblical subjects. Various scenes in the film were seen as recycled tropes from the post-apocalyptic genre; a scene in which Lot leads a band of pirates in an attack on the Ark was compared to Waterworld. Even so, the second night set a movie ratings mark for NBC that it did not pass again until 2004.

The Malaysian government banned the film from being televised in the country under laws that prohibit any televised depiction of the prophets of Islam, including Noah and Lot.

References

External links
 
 

1999 television films
1999 films
1990s American television miniseries
1999 romantic drama films
1990s adventure films
American romantic drama films
Noah's Ark in film
Sonar Entertainment miniseries
NBC network original films
Films directed by John Irvin
Noah's Ark in television
American drama television films
1990s English-language films
1990s American films